"Fury" is a song by Prince, from his 2006 album 3121. The single was debuted live on Saturday Night Live on February 4, 2006.

Track listing

CD single
 "Fury"
 "Te Amo Corazón" / "Fury" (Live at BRIT Awards)
 "Te Amo Corazón" / "Fury" (Live at BRIT Awards) (Video)

12" vinyl (picture disc)
 "Fury"
 "Te Amo Corazon" / "Fury" (Live at BRIT Awards)

Charts

References

2006 singles
Music videos directed by Sanaa Hamri
Prince (musician) songs
Songs written by Prince (musician)
NPG Records singles
Song recordings produced by Prince (musician)
2006 songs